Borovići  is a village in the municipality of Goražde, Bosnia and Herzegovina.

Demographics 
According to the 2013 census, its population was 87, all Bosniaks.

References

Populated places in Goražde